The military regions of the Spanish Armed Forces were a administrative subdivision that existed in Spain from the 18th century to the end of the 20th century. They constituted a territorial subdivision in terms of the allocation of human and material resources for defence purposes, and responded to a territorial defence model (see :es:Neutralidad armada, Armed Neutrality).

Spanish Army 
Spanish military regions were commanded by a captain general and the garrisons were made up of regiments, which were grouped into brigades and divisions, commanded by the respective generals. There were also auxiliary and non-combatant units (for example health, Quartermaster, etc.) and other combatant units not grouped into regiments and reporting directly to the captain general (for example, naval or air forces).

Origins 

In 1492, the Catholic Monarchs created the first captaincy general of Castile in the recently conquered Kingdom of Granada. This would later lead to the creation of the military regions. During the reign of Felipe V of Spain the old figure of Captain General, responsible for the royal army present in his jurisdiction, was revitalized.

The division of Spain into captaincies general dates from 1705, when they adjusted to the old kingdoms that constituted the Hispanic Monarchy. They were thirteen regions: Andalusia, Aragon, Burgos, Canary Islands, Castilla la Vieja, Catalonia, Extremadura, Galicia, Coast of Granada, Guipúzcoa, Mallorca, Navarra and Valencia. In 1714 the Captaincy General of Castilla la Nueva was created from the General Commissariat of the War People of Madrid.

In 1898 the peninsular territory was reduced to seven new military regions, while at the same time that the General Command of Balearic Islands, Canary Islands, Ceuta and Melilla. In 1907 the captaincies general were restructured, receiving the name of military regions.

Second Republic 
During the Second Spanish Republic, one of the military reforms of the politician and minister Manuel Azaña suppressed the military regions, creating instead the organic divisions commanded by a major general.

Francoism 
At the end of the Civil War, the Spanish (Francoist) Army numbered 1,020,500 men, in 60 Divisions. During the first year of peace, Franco dramatically reduced the size of the Army to 250,000 in early 1940, with most soldiers two-year conscripts.

After the establishment of the Franco dictatorship, through the Decree of 4 July 1939 of the Ministry of National Defence the administrative division of military regions and their scope were officially established. The eight traditional Military Regions (Madrid, Sevilla, Valencia, Barcelona, Zaragoza, Burgos, Valladolid, La Coruña) were reestablished. In 1944 a ninth Military Region, with its headquarters in Granada, was created.

Military Regions of Spain (1939–1984)

The Ninth Military Region was not created in 1939. Due to the Allied landings in North Africa, Operation Torch, in November 1942, the creation of the IX Military Region was established to reorganize the forces in the area. For this purpose, it was established as a segregation of the II Military Region and with General Captaincy in Granada, on 1 March 1944.

Democracy 

After 1978, along with other extrapeninsular demarcations, the Spanish Army went from being divided from nine to six and four military regions. Royal Decree 1132/1997, of 11 July, which restructures the military organization of the national territory for the Army. To this end, on 17 October 1984 the second (Seville) and ninth (Granada) were abolished, to constitute the Southern Military Region, in application of the decree of restructuring of the territorial organization for the Army, which was approved that same year.

References 

Spain
Military units and formations of Spain